The  United Nations Preventive Deployment Force (UNPREDEP) was established on 31 March 1995 in Security Council Resolution 983 to replace the United Nations Protection Force (UNPROFOR) in the Republic of North Macedonia. The mandate of UNPREDEP remained essentially the same: to monitor and report any developments in the border areas which could undermine confidence and stability in the country and threaten its territory.  It is widely considered to be an instance of a successful deployment of UN peacekeeping forces in the prevention of conflict and violence against civilians. The operation was shut down on 28 February 1999, after its last extension in Resolution 1186 when China vetoed its renewal in 1999 following North Macedonia's diplomatic recognition of Taiwan. This mission was unique as it was the first peacekeeping operation to undertake conflict prevention before the outbreak of conflict.

See also
 Yugoslav Wars

References

External reference
Records of the United Nations Preventive Deployment Force (UNPREDEP) (1995-1999) at the United Nations Archives

United Nations operations in the former Yugoslavia
Modern history of North Macedonia
United Nations Security Council mandates
Organizations established in 1995
North Macedonia and the United Nations
Military operations involving the United States